Bibliography of Colditz Castle is a list of works about Colditz Castle, its history as POW camp Oflag IV-C, the attempts to escape Oflag IV-C and many prisoners memoirs.

Books in whole or in part about Colditz POW camp

Other books (where Colditz is at least mentioned)
Bader, Douglas.
Reach for the Sky. London, Glasgow, Collins Books, 1954.
Barry, Rupert. 
"The First Escape of the War." [Escape from Laufen in 1940]
Cash, William. 
"Escape to Colditz". The Spectator, (7 April 1990), pp. 14-15. 
Gleeson, Janet. 
The Arcanum: The Extraordinary True Story. New York: Warner Books, 1998.
Graham, Burton. 
Escape from the Nazis. Secaucus, New Jersey: Castle Books, 1975.    
Langer, Herbert. 
The Thirty Years' War. Translated by C.S.V. Salt. New York: Dorset Press, 1978, 1990.
Marshall Cavendish Corporation. 
Escape from the Swastika. London: Marshall Cavendish Books, 1975.
McAvoy, George E. 
A Citizen-Soldier Remembers, 1942-1946: 149th Armored Signal Company of the 9th Armored Division. Littleton, New Hamspire, Crawford Press, 1991.
McCombs, Don, and Fred L. Worth. 
World War II: 4,139 Strange and Fascinating Facts. New York: Wing Books, 1983.
Melton, H. Keith. 
The Ultimate Spy Book. New York: DK Publishing, 1996.
Mills, John. 
Up in the Clouds, Gentlemen Please. New York: Ticknor & Fields, 1981.
Nafziger, George. 
Lutzen & Bautzen: Napoleon's Spring Campaign of 1813. Chicago, Illinois: Emperor's Press, 1992.
--. 
Napoleon at Leipzig: The Battle of Nations, 1813. Chicago, Illinois: Emperor's Press, 1996.
"Official Reports from the Camps: Oflag IVC, Colditz". 
The Prisoner of War: The Official Journal of the Prisoner of War Department of the Red Cross and St. John War Organization, St. James Palace, London S.W.1., Volume 3, Number 35 (March, 1945), pp. 10.   
Petre, F. Loraine. 
Napoleon's Last Campaign in Germany, 1813. New York: John Lane Company, 1962.
Rabb, Theodore K. 
Renaissance Lives: Portraits of an Age. New York: Pantheon Books, 1993. [Chapter on Jan Hus]
Ramsden, John. 
"Refocusing 'the People's War': British War Films of the 1950s". Journal of Contemporary History, Volume 33, Number 1 (January 1998), pp. ?  
Schumann, Robert. 
[Many of the numerous books about Robert and Clara Schumann] 
Shoemaker, Lloyd R. 
The Escape Factory: The Story of MIS-X. New York: St. Martin's Press, 1990.

External links

Bibliography
Colditz